Leonard Alan Lauder (born March 19, 1933) is an American billionaire, philanthropist, art collector. He and his brother, Ronald Lauder, are the sole heirs to the Estée Lauder Companies cosmetics fortune, founded by their parents, Estée Lauder and Joseph Lauder, in 1946. Having been its CEO until 1999, Lauder is the chairman emeritus of The Estée Lauder Companies Inc. During his tenure as the CEO, the company went public at The New York Stock Exchange in 1996 and acquired several major cosmetics brands, including MAC Cosmetics, Aveda, Bobbi Brown, and La Mer.

In 2013, Lauder promised his collection of Cubist art to The Metropolitan Museum of Art. The collection is valued at over $1 billion and constitutes one of the largest gifts in the museum's history.

Bloomberg Billionaires Index estimated Lauder's net worth at US$32.3 billion as of September 2021, the 44th richest person in the world.

Biography
Leonard Lauder is the elder son of Joseph and Estée Lauder and the elder brother of Ronald Lauder. His family is Jewish. He married Evelyn Hausner in July 1959. They had two sons: William, executive chairman of the Estée Lauder Companies, and Gary, managing director of Lauder Partners LLC. He is a graduate of the Wharton School of the University of Pennsylvania, and he also studied at Columbia University's Graduate School of Business before serving as a lieutenant in the U.S. Navy.

He formally joined Estée Lauder in 1958 when he was 25. He created the company's first research and development laboratory in the mid-1990s and was responsible for the company acquiring brands like MAC, Bobbi Brown and Aveda. Under his leadership in the late 1980s, Estée Lauder opened its first store in Moscow with support from the Gosbank daughter the Moscow Narodny Bank Limited in London.

Lauder stepped down as CEO of Estée Lauder in 1999, but remains Chairman Emeritus of the company and is known around the company as "Chief Teaching Officer".

Lauder gained notoriety in 2001 for creating the Lipstick index, a since discredited economic indicator, meant to reflect a proclivity to spend money on luxury items even in the face of crisis.  For many years, he has resided on the Upper East Side in Manhattan. On January 1, 2015, Lauder married photographer Judy Ellis Glickman.

Leonard Lauder, unlike his brother, supported Kathy Hochul's first campaign for New York governor in 2022.

Art collection
Lauder is a major art collector (he began by buying Art Deco postcards when he was six), but his particular focus, rather than on American artists, is on works by the Cubist masters Picasso, Braque, Gris, and Léger. He also collects Klimt. Much of his art comes from some of the world's most celebrated collections, including those of Gertrude Stein, the Swiss banker Raoul La Roche, and the British art historian Douglas Cooper.

In autumn, 2012, the Museum of Fine Arts, Boston opened an exhibition of 700 of his postcards, a tiny part of the promised gift he has made to the museum of 120,000 postcards: The Postcard Age: Selections from the Leonard A. Lauder Collection. In an interview in The New Yorker, Lauder explained how postcards turned him into a collector, and how these "mini-masterpieces" remained his lifelong pursuit to the point where his late wife, Evelyn, called the collection his "mistress". He donated his collection of Oilette postcards, published by Raphael Tuck & Sons, to Chicago's Newberry Library, and funded their digitization; the Newberry launched the 26,000-item Tuck digital collection in 2019.

Lauder's interest in postcards led him to be acquainted with one of the owners of the Gotham Book Mart, a Manhattan bookstore, and he sought to help the Gotham re-establish its presence in the city when the owner had sold its long-time building and needed a new space. Lauder bought a building at 16 East 46th Street along with a partner, letting the building's storefront space to the Gotham. Later, the Gotham fell behind on rents, eventually resulting in Lauder and his partner to file for eviction. In a much-publicized closure of the bookstore, the New York City Marshal later auctioned the store's inventory, which was bought in a lot by Lauder and his partner to some protest from many other independent book sellers and collectors who were present at the proceedings and hoping to purchase some of the bibliophilic treasures.

Philanthropy

Arts and culture
Lauder has long been a major benefactor of the Whitney Museum of American Art. In 1971, he joined the museum's acquisitions board and in 1977, by then president of his family's business, he became a Whitney trustee. He became president in 1990 and has been chairman since 1994. He has donated both money and many works of art to the Whitney, and is the museum's most prolific fundraiser. His 2008 donation to it of $131 million is the largest in the museum's history. Through the Leonard and Evelyn Lauder Fund, he and his wife have also sponsored several exhibitions at the Whitney. The fifth-floor permanent collection galleries are named for the couple. In 1998, he told a reporter for The New York Times that his "dream job" was to be the Whitney Museum's director. Most recently, Lauder gave $131 million for the Whitney's endowment.

A long-time supporter of the Metropolitan Museum of Art in New York City, Lauder led the creation of a research center for Modern art at the museum, which he helped support through a $22 million endowment made alongside museum trustees and other benefactors. In April 2013, he promised his collection of 81 pieces of Cubist art, consisting of 34 pieces by Pablo Picasso, 17 by Georges Braque, 15 by Fernand Léger, and 15 by Juan Gris to the museum; together, they are valued at more than one billion dollars. It has been described by William Acquavella, of Acquavella Galleries, as "without doubt the most important collection any private person has put together in many, many years,"  Art historian Emily Braun, who co-organized the 2014 Met exhibition of Lauder's Cubist collection with Rebecca Rabinow, has served as Leonard Lauder's personal curator since 1987.

Social causes
Lauder is co-founder and chairman of the Alzheimer's Drug Discovery Foundation, a member of the Council on Foreign Relations, a trustee of the Aspen Institute, chairman of The Aspen Institute International Committee, honorary chair of the Breast Cancer Research Foundation, and a member of the President's Council of Memorial Sloan-Kettering Hospital. Along with his wife, Evelyn, he helped create the Evelyn H Lauder Breast Center at Memorial Sloan-Kettering Cancer Center in New York City and the Breast Cancer Research Foundation. In February 2022, he donated $125 million to University of Pennsylvania to establish a new tuition-free nurse practitioner program within Penn Nursing.

Memoir
Lauder's memoir, The Company I Keep: My Life in Beauty was published in 2020.

Awards and honors

See also
 List of billionaires
 Lauder Institute

References

External links
 The Pleasure of Postcards in The New Yorker by Judith H. Dobrzynski

Place of birth missing (living people)
1933 births
20th-century American businesspeople
20th-century art collectors
20th-century American naval officers
21st-century American businesspeople
21st-century art collectors
American billionaires
American chairpersons of corporations
American cosmetics businesspeople
American humanitarians
American founders
American people of Czech-Jewish descent
American people of Hungarian-Jewish descent
American retail chief executives
Art museum people
Businesspeople from New York City
Columbia Business School alumni
The Daily Pennsylvanian people
Jewish American art collectors
Jewish American philanthropists
Lauder family
Living people
Military personnel from New York City
People from the Upper East Side
Philanthropists from New York (state)
Postcards
Trustees of museums
Wharton School of the University of Pennsylvania alumni
People associated with the Whitney Museum of American Art
The Bronx High School of Science alumni
Deltiologists